Scoparia is a grass moth genus (family Crambidae) of subfamily Scopariinae. Some authors have assigned the synonymous taxon Sineudonia to the snout moth family (Pyralidae), where all grass moths were once also included, but this seems to be in error.

As of 2012, there were about 231 species. Species occur on every continent except Antarctica. They are most reliably distinguished from one another by the structure of the male genitalia.

Species
Scoparia absconditalis Christoph in Romanoff, 1887
Scoparia acharis Meyrick, 1885
Scoparia acropola Meyrick, 1885
Scoparia aequipennalis Warren, 1905
Scoparia afghanorum Leraut, 1985
Scoparia albifrons Druce, 1896
Scoparia albifusalis Hampson, 1907
Scoparia albipunctata Druce, 1899
Scoparia albonigra Nuss, 2000
Scoparia alticola Meyrick, 1935
Scoparia ambigualis (Treitschke, 1829)
Scoparia anadonta Dyar, 1918
Scoparia anagantis Dyar, 1918
Scoparia anaplecta Meyrick, 1885
Scoparia ancipitella (La Harpe, 1855)
Scoparia animosa Meyrick, 1914
Scoparia antarcticalis Staudinger, 1899
Scoparia apachealis Munroe, 1972
Scoparia apheles (Meyrick, 1884)
Scoparia arcta T. P. Lucas, 1898
Scoparia argolina (Lower, 1902)
Scoparia astragalota (Meyrick, 1885)
Scoparia atricuprea Hampson, 1917
Scoparia augastis Meyrick, 1907
Scoparia australiensis (Hampson, 1899)
Scoparia autochroa Meyrick, 1907
Scoparia autumna Philpott, 1927
Scoparia axiolecta Turner, 1922
Scoparia basalis Walker, 1866
Scoparia basistrigalis Knaggs, 1866
Scoparia benigna Meyrick, 1910
Scoparia berytella Rebel, 1911
Scoparia bifaria Li, Li & Nuss, 2010
Scoparia biplagialis Walker, 1866
Scoparia biradiellus (Mabille, 1885)
Scoparia biscutella Zeller, 1872
Scoparia blanchardi Munroe, 1972
Scoparia brevituba Li, Li & Nuss, 2010
Scoparia brunnea (Leraut, 1986)
Scoparia caesia (Philpott, 1926)
Scoparia californialis Munroe, 1972
Scoparia caliginosa Philpott, 1918
Scoparia canicostalis Hampson, 1896
Scoparia caradjai Leraut, 1986
Scoparia carvalhoi Nuss, Karsholt & Meyer, 1998

Scoparia chalicodes Meyrick, 1885
Scoparia charopoea Turner, 1908
Scoparia chiasta Meyrick, 1885
Scoparia cinefacta Philpott, 1926
Scoparia cinereomedia Dyar, 1904
Scoparia claranota Howes, 1946
Scoparia clavata Philpott, 1912
Scoparia coecimaculalis Warren, 1905
Scoparia congestalis Walker, 1859
Scoparia conicella (La Harpe, 1863)
Scoparia contempta (Turner, 1927)
Scoparia contexta Philpott, 1931
Scoparia cordata Li, 2012
Scoparia crepuscula Salmon, 1946
Scoparia crocalis Hampson, 1903
Scoparia crocospila Turner, 1922
Scoparia crucigera Gerasimov, 1930
Scoparia crypserythra (Lower, 1901)
Scoparia cyameuta (Meyrick, 1885)
Scoparia declivis Philpott, 1918
Scoparia dela J. F. G. Clarke, 1965
Scoparia delicatalis Walker, 1866
Scoparia deliniens T. P. Lucas, 1898
Scoparia denigata Dyar, 1929
Scoparia depressoides Inoue, 1994
Scoparia dicteella Rebel, 1916
Scoparia dipenda Maes, 1996
Scoparia dispersa Butler, 1883
Scoparia distictalis (Hampson, 1908)
Scoparia dominicki Munroe, 1972
Scoparia dryphactis Meyrick, 1911
Scoparia ejuncida Knaggs, 1867
Scoparia elongalis Maes, 1996
Scoparia emmetropis Turner, 1915

Scoparia encapna Meyrick, 1888
Scoparia epigypsa (Lower, 1902)
Scoparia ergatis Meyrick, 1885
Scoparia erythroneura (Turner, 1937)
Scoparia eumeles Meyrick, 1885
Scoparia eutacta Turner, 1931
Scoparia exhibitalis Walker, [1866]
Scoparia fakoensis Maes, 1996
Scoparia falsa Philpott, 1924
Scoparia famularis Philpott, 1930
Scoparia favilliferella (Walker, 1866)
Scoparia fimbriata Philpott, 1917
Scoparia fragosa Meyrick, 1910
Scoparia fumata Philpott, 1915
Scoparia gallica Peyerimhoff, 1873
Scoparia ganevi Leraut, 1985
Scoparia gethosyna Turner, 1922
Scoparia glauculalis Hampson, 1897
Scoparia gomphota Meyrick, 1885
Scoparia gracilis Philpott, 1924
Scoparia graeca Nuss, 2005
Scoparia halopis Meyrick, 1909
Scoparia harpalea (Meyrick, 1885)
Scoparia huachucalis Munroe, 1972
Scoparia humilialis Hudson, 1950
Scoparia hypoxantha Lower, 1896
Scoparia ignicola (Staudinger, 1899)
Scoparia illota Philpott, 1919
Scoparia indica Leraut, 1986
Scoparia indistinctalis (Walker, 1863)

Scoparia ingratella (Zeller, 1846)
Scoparia ischnoptera Turner, 1922
Scoparia italica Turati, 1919
Scoparia ithyntis Turner, 1922
Scoparia iwasakii Sasaki, 1991
Scoparia jiuzhaiensis Li, Li & Nuss, 2010
Scoparia jonesalis Dyar, 1915
Scoparia juldusellus (Caradja, 1916)
Scoparia kanai Maes, 1996
Scoparia largispinea Li, Li & Nuss, 2010
Scoparia latipennis Sasaki, 1991
Scoparia lativitta (Moore, 1883)
Scoparia leucomela Lower, 1893
Scoparia leuconota (Lower, 1902)
Scoparia limatula Philpott, 1901
Scoparia longipennis Zeller, 1872
Scoparia lychnophanes Meyrick, 1927
Scoparia mandschurica Christoph, 1881
Scoparia manifestella (Herrich-Schäffer, 1848)
Scoparia matsuii Inoue, 1994
Scoparia matuta J. F. G. Clarke, 1965
Scoparia mediorufalis Hampson, 1896
Scoparia melanoxantha Turner, 1922
Scoparia metaleucalis Hampson, 1907
Scoparia meyi Nuss, 1998
Scoparia meyrickii (Butler, 1882)
Scoparia molestalis Inoue, 1982
Scoparia molifera Meyrick, 1926
Scoparia monochroma Salmon, 1946
Scoparia monticola Nuss, 1998
Scoparia multifacies Dyar, 1929
Scoparia murificalis Walker, 1859
Scoparia nephelitis (Meyrick, 1887)
Scoparia ngangaoensis Maes, 2004
Scoparia nigripunctalis Maes, 2004
Scoparia niphetodes Turner, 1931
Scoparia niphospora (Meyrick, 1884)

Scoparia nipponalis Inoue, 1982
Scoparia noacki Nuss, 2002
Scoparia nomeutis (Meyrick, 1885)
Scoparia normalis Dyar, 1904
Scoparia objurgalis Guenée, 1854
Scoparia obsoleta Staudinger, 1879
Scoparia ochrophara Turner, 1915
Scoparia ochrotalis Hampson, 1903
Scoparia olivaris Hampson, 1891
Scoparia ololuae Maes, 2004
Scoparia oxycampyla (Turner, 1937)
Scoparia oxygona Meyrick, 1897
Scoparia pallidula Philpott, 1928
Scoparia palloralis Dyar, 1906
Scoparia panopla Meyrick, 1885
Scoparia parachalca Meyrick, 1901
Scoparia paracycla (Lower, 1902)
Scoparia parca Philpott, 1928
Scoparia parmifera Meyrick, 1909
Scoparia pascoella Philpott, 1920
Scoparia pediopola (Turner, 1937)
Scoparia penumbralis Dyar, 1906
Scoparia perplexella (Zeller, 1839)
Scoparia petrina (Meyrick, 1885)
Scoparia phaealis Hampson, 1903
Scoparia phalerias Meyrick, 1905
Scoparia philippinensis (Hampson, 1917)
Scoparia philonephes (Meyrick, 1885)
Scoparia plagiotis Meyrick, 1887
Scoparia platymera Lower, 1905
Scoparia polialis Hampson, 1903
Scoparia poliophaealis Hampson, 1907

Scoparia pulveralis Snellen, 1890
Scoparia pulverulentellus (Zeller, 1872)
Scoparia pura Philpott, 1924
Scoparia pusillula Munroe, 1995
Scoparia pyralella (Denis & Schiffermüller, 1775)
Scoparia pyraustoides J. F. G. Clarke, 1965
Scoparia resinodes de Joannis, 1932
Scoparia rigidalis Barnes & McDunnough, 1912
Scoparia rotuellus (C. Felder, R. Felder & Rogenhofer, 1875)
Scoparia rufostigma Hampson, 1891
Scoparia ruidosalis Munroe, 1972
Scoparia saerdabella Osthelder, 1938
Scoparia scripta Philpott, 1918
Scoparia semiamplalis Warren, 1905
Scoparia sideraspis Meyrick, 1905
Scoparia sinensis Leraut, 1986
Scoparia sinuata Philpott, 1930
Scoparia spadix Nuss, 1998
Scoparia spelaea Meyrick, 1885
Scoparia spinata Inoue, 1982
Scoparia spinosa Li, Li & Nuss, 2010
Scoparia staudingeralis (Mabille, 1869)
Scoparia stenopa Lower, 1902
Scoparia stoetzneri Caradja, 1927
Scoparia strigigramma Hampson, 1917
Scoparia subfusca Haworth, 1811
Scoparia subgracilis Sasaki, 1998
Scoparia subita (Philpott, 1912)
Scoparia submedinella Caradja, 1927
Scoparia submolestalis Inoue, 1982
Scoparia subtersa Dyar, 1929
Scoparia sylvestris C. E. Clarke, 1926
Scoparia syntaracta Meyrick, 1885
Scoparia taiwanensis Sasaki, 1998
Scoparia termobola Meyrick, 1938
Scoparia tetracycla Meyrick, 1885
Scoparia tohokuensis Inoue, 1982
Scoparia trapezophora Meyrick, 1885
Scoparia triscelis Meyrick, 1909
Scoparia tristicta Turner, 1922
Scoparia tritocirrha Turner, 1918
Scoparia tuicana C. E. Clarke, 1926
Scoparia turneri Philpott, 1928
Scoparia ulmaya Dyar, 1929
Scoparia uncinata Li, Li & Nuss, 2010
Scoparia ustimacula C. Felder, R. Felder & Rogenhofer, 1875
Scoparia utsugii Inoue, 1994
Scoparia valenternota Howes, 1946
Scoparia vinotinctalis Hampson, 1896
Scoparia vulpecula Meyrick, 1927
Scoparia x-signata (Filipjev, 1927)
Scoparia yakushimana Inoue, 1982
Scoparia yamanakai Inoue, 1982

Selected former species
Scoparia atropicta Hampson, 1897

References

 , 1984: Contribution à l'étude des Scopariinae. 4. Révision des types décrits de la région paléarctique occidentale, description de dix nouveaux taxa et ébauche d'une liste des espèces de cette région. (Lepidoptera: Crambidae). Nouvelle Revue d'Entomologie Alexanor: 157-192.
 , 1985: Contribution à l'étude des Scopariinae. 5. Quatre nouveaux taxa d'Afghanistan. (Lepidoptera: Crambidae). Nouvelle Revue d'Entomologie N.S. 2 (3): 325-329.
 , 1986: Contribution à l'étude des Scopariinae. 6. Dix nouveaux taxa, dont trois genres, de Chine et du nord de l'Inde. (Lepidoptera: Crambidae). Nouvelle Revue d'Entomologie N.S. 3 (1): 123-131.
 
 , 1998: The Scopariinae and Heliothelinae stat. rev. (Lepidoptera: Pyraloidea: Crambidae) of the Oriental Region- a revisional synopsis with descriptions of new species from the Philippines and Sumatra. Nachrichten entomologische Verein Apollo 17 Suppl.: 475-528.
 , 1998: Notes on the Scopariinae from Taiwan, with descriptions of nine new species (Lepidoptera: Crambidae). Tinea 15 (3): 191-201.

External links
Scoparia. Natural History Museum, London.

Crambidae genera
Scopariinae
Taxa named by Adrian Hardy Haworth